Crotonogynopsis is a plant genus of the family Euphorbiaceae first described as a genus in 1899. It is native to tropical Africa.

Species
 Crotonogynopsis akeassii J.Léonard - Ivory Coast, Ghana
 Crotonogynopsis usambarica Pax -  Cameroon, Zaïre, Uganda, Tanzania, Mozambique

References

Adelieae
Euphorbiaceae genera